is a role-playing video game produced by Square that was released exclusively in Japan in 1989 for the  Family Computer (the Japanese version of the Nintendo Entertainment System). The game is directly based on Mark Twain's renowned 1876 novel, The Adventures of Tom Sawyer, and was developed in the role-playing video game niche that made Square famous with its acclaimed Final Fantasy series of video games.

Gameplay

Players control Tom Sawyer and his friends as they join the party, such as Jim and Huck, and they each have RPG game statistics such as health, power, and speed. Characters can equip no weapons, and fight with their fists, but there are a large number of collectible items. Key cards and black magic are also present in the game. The game features an enemy that triggers the reset button on a players controller bringing them back to the title screen.

Plot and setting
Square's Tom Sawyer is based on Mark Twain’s 19th century book “The Adventures of Tom Sawyer” and features many characters from that book.
The plot takes place in 1855 on the Mississippi River in the fictional town of St. Petersburg, Missouri. The game begins with Tom Sawyer having a dream saying that in a southern location a pirate treasure is buried. Aunt Polly wakes Tom the next morning, and Tom sets out to find the treasure.

Development
Square's Tom Sawyer was scored by famed Final Fantasy composer Nobuo Uematsu, who is described as taking a more "scenic" approach to the game than his previous works. Artist Katsutoshi Fujioka worked on the game title as well. Around the time that Sakaguchi was writing scenarios for what would become the original Final Fantasy,  Hiromichi Tanaka decided to make a game based on “Tom Sawyer” at the same time and formed a team to make it. Takashi Tokita developed some of the graphics, and designed Tom Sawyer as well, but working on the game was difficult for Square to do as teams struggled to finish both games at once, and help was given by the different teams to complete the titles.

Being released between Final Fantasy II and Final Fantasy III, the game was similar to Final Fantasy II in that there was no experience point system. Many of the gameplay systems were later seen in an evolved form in the SaGa series. Goto Komori, a detective writer, created the games scenarios. The game had the name “Square” added to the front as another video game about Tom Sawyer came out earlier the same year. Tom hunting for buried treasure is a plot point taken from the original story.  According to Nobuo Uematsu, the game was not immediately released after it was completed, and came out a long time after in order to avoid big game releases by Square or their rivals.

Reception and legacy

The game was never localized outside Japan, and was noted by IGN as an example of racism in video games. In 2010, UGO ranked it as the #4 most racist video game in history.

The portrayal of black people as blackfaced caricatures with huge lips has been noted about the game. In GameSpy'''s retrospective overview of the Famicom, Benjamin Turner and Christian Nutt's Square column concludes that "one of the most amusing Square games that didn't come [to the U.S.] was Square's Tom Sawyer'', an RPG starring the happy-go-lucky boy wonder that featured a...racially insensitive...character." Artist Takashi Tokita explained in 2018 that when the game was made, there was not a “standards and practices”  department to ensure that games did not contain materials that would be offensive in other cultures.

References

External links
 Square Enix Square's Tom Sawyer Page

1989 video games
Works based on The Adventures of Tom Sawyer
Japan-exclusive video games
Nintendo Entertainment System games
Nintendo Entertainment System-only games
Role-playing video games
Square (video game company) games
Video games based on novels
Video games developed in Japan
Video games scored by Nobuo Uematsu
Video games set in the 19th century
Video games set in Missouri
Video game controversies
Obscenity controversies in video games
African-American-related controversies
Race-related controversies in video games